Hula (or Vula’a, Bula’a, Vulaa) is an Oceanic language spoken in the Hula area of the Rigo district, in Papua New Guinea. It is close to, but distinct from, its neighbour Keapara.

Dialects
The Hula language includes several dialectal varieties: Alewai, Irupara, Kaporoko, Vula.

References

Central Papuan Tip languages
Languages of Central Province (Papua New Guinea)